Roderick Fletcher Mead (1900–1971) was an American painter. Mead was best known for his engravings, but his work encompassed a number of media including oil paintings, prints, etchings, woodcut and also watercolors. He is represented in the collections of the Metropolitan Museum of Art, Carnegie Institute, and the Victoria and Albert Museum, among others.

Born in South Orange, New Jersey in 1900, he attended Newark Academy, where he received instruction in art among other subjects, and graduated from Yale University in 1925 with a degree in fine arts. Having moved to New York City after college, Mead took instruction at the Art Students League of New York, including classes and later private instruction with painter George Luks. He also studied watercolor painting under George Pearse Ennis in the late 1920s at the Grand Central School of Art.

In the 1930s, Mead worked under printmaker Stanley William Hayter in Paris at Atelier 17, and was exposed to surrealism and abstraction in the work of artists such as Joan Miró, Pablo Picasso, and Yves Tanguy.

After the outbreak of World War II, Mead returned to the US and relocated to Carlsbad, New Mexico in the 1940s, where he took inspiration from the animals and plants of the surrounding high desert environment. He had a brief stint as an engraver for the Potash Company of America there in the 1950s.

In 2016, the Carlsbad, New Mexico Museum & Art Center created a small gallery dedicated to his work, with over 30 pieces on display.

After surviving a previous cancer diagnosis in the 1960s, Mead succumbed to a second bout with the disease in 1971.

List of major works

 (1951) The Wooden Horse Brooklyn Museum
 (1954) Horned Animals Museum of Modern Art

One-Man Shows	
 California Palace of the Legion of Honor
 Museum of the University of New Mexico
 Columbus Gallery of Fine Arts
 Louisville Art Center

References

External links
Roderick Mead at MoMA
Roderick Mead at the Smithsonian American Art Museum
Roderick Mead at the National Gallery of Art

1900 births
1971 deaths
20th-century American painters
American male painters
20th-century American artists
Art Students League of New York alumni
Painters from New Jersey
Newark Academy alumni
People from Carlsbad, New Mexico
People from South Orange, New Jersey